Gragnaniello is an Italian surname. Notable people with the surname include:

Enzo Gragnaniello (born 1954), Italian singer-songwriter and composer
Raffaele Gragnaniello (born 1981), Italian footballer

Italian-language surnames